Chacabuco Department may refer to:

Chacabuco Department, Chaco
Chacabuco Department, San Luis

Department name disambiguation pages